Tortora, an Italian word meaning turtle dove, may refer to:

Places
Tortora, an Italian municipality of the Province of Cosenza, Calabria

People
Enzo Tortora, Italian journalist and politician
Max Tortora (born 1963), Italian actor

See also
Tortola, an island part of the British Virgin Islands
Tortorella, an Italian municipality of the Province of Salerno, Campania
Tortorella (disambiguation)

Italian-language surnames